Got What It Takes?  is a British talent show that began airing on CBBC on 6 January 2016. Originally presented by Lauren Platt for the first three series, Got What It Takes? has been hosted by Anna Maynard since 2018. In 2021, Melvin Odoom joined Maynard as a co-host.

The series sees contestants compete against each other in challenges such as writing songs, performing for celebrity guests and learning choreography. The winner of each series is given the chance to perform at BBC Radio 1's Big Weekend, and as of 2021, the six winners are Amaria Braithwaite, Jorja Douglas, Rio Donkin, Lauren Mia Jones, Georgie Mills and Tilly Lockey.

Format
Eight young singers take part in the singing talent competition. In each episode, three contestants are chosen to compete in a sing-off, whilst their mothers/aunts/sisters vote for who they want to win. Each week, the contestants learn about an aspect in the music industry, while their mothers/aunts/sisters compete for their child's place in the sing-off. The performer with the most sing-off wins automatically reaches the final, and three more are voted for by the public, where they compete for the chance to perform at BBC Radio 1's Big Weekend.

Series overview

Series 1 (2016)
 Winner
 Finalist
 Semi-Finalist

Series 2 (2017)
 Winner
 Finalist
 Semi-Finalist

Series 3 (2018)
 Winner
 Finalist
 Semi-Finalist

Series 4 (2018)
 Winner
 Finalist
 Semi-Finalist

Series 5 (2020)
 Winner
 Finalist
 Semi-Finalist

Series 6 (2021)
On 26 June 2020, applications for the sixth series of Got What It Takes? were opened on the CBBC website, with the first episode being aired on 11 May 2021. This series followed social distancing guidelines due to the COVID-19 pandemic.

 Winner
 Finalist
 Semi-Finalist

References

External links
 
 

2016 British television series debuts
2010s British children's television series
2010s British reality television series
2020s British children's television series
2020s British reality television series
BBC children's television shows
English-language television shows
Singing talent shows
Television series about teenagers